Halveh or Halvah or Helveh may refer to:
 Halveh, Khuzestan
 Halveh, West Azerbaijan